Aden unrest can refer to the following violent incidents in Aden:
1947 Aden riots
Yemeni–Adenese clan violence 1956-60
Aden unrest (2015–present)